Christopher Asher Wray (born December 17, 1966) is an American attorney who is the eighth Director of the Federal Bureau of Investigation, serving since 2017. From 2003 to 2005, Wray served as Assistant Attorney General in charge of the Criminal Division in George W. Bush's administration. From 2005 to 2016, he was a litigation partner with the law firm King & Spalding.

Early life and education
Christopher Asher Wray was born in New York City, New York. His father, Cecil A. Wray Jr., was a graduate of Vanderbilt University and Yale Law School, who worked as a lawyer at Debevoise & Plimpton in New York. His paternal grandfather, T. Cecil Wray, was the city manager of Brentwood, Tennessee from 1971 to 1973. His paternal great-grandfather, Taylor Malone, was also a Vanderbilt University graduate, and the co-founder and president of Malone & Hyde, "one of the South's largest wholesale grocery firms." His maternal grandfather, Samuel E. Gates, "helped shape the laws that govern national and international airline flights" as an official of the Bureau of Air Commerce.

Wray attended the private Buckley School<ref>Soon-to-be FBI director has Adirondack ties, Lake Placid News, Chris Knight, July 30, 2017. Retrieved October 11, 2018.</ref> in New York City and the private boarding school Phillips Academy in Andover, Massachusetts. Wray then attended Yale University from which he graduated cum laude with a Bachelor of Arts degree with a major in philosophy in 1989, and earned his Juris Doctor in 1992 from Yale Law School. While at Yale Law, Wray was the executive editor of the Yale Law Journal. After graduating from law school, Wray spent a year clerking for Judge J. Michael Luttig of the United States Court of Appeals for the Fourth Circuit.

 Career 
 Government service 

Wray joined the government in 1997 as an Assistant United States Attorney for the Northern District of Georgia. In 2001, he moved to the Justice Department as associate deputy attorney general and principal associate deputy attorney general.
 
On June 9, 2003, President George W. Bush nominated Wray to be the 33rd Assistant Attorney General in charge of the Criminal Division of the Justice Department. Wray was unanimously confirmed by the Senate on September 11, 2003. Wray was Assistant Attorney General from 2003 to 2005, working under Deputy Attorney General James Comey. While heading the Criminal Division, Wray oversaw prominent fraud investigations, including Enron. In 2013, it was revealed that Wray was one of the senior Justice Dept officials who nearly resigned in 2004, alongside then FBI Director Robert Mueller and Deputy Attorney General James Comey, due to illegal surveillance techniques the Bush administration had put in place under the Terrorist Surveillance Program. In March 2005, Wray announced that he would resign from his post. His last day at the Justice Department was on May 17, 2005.

In 2005, Wray received the Edmund J. Randolph Award, the Justice Department's highest award for public service and leadership.

 Private law practice 
Wray joined King & Spalding in 2005 as a litigation partner in the firm's Washington, D.C., and Atlanta offices. Wray represented several Fortune 100 companies and chaired the King & Spalding Special Matters and Government Investigations Practice Group. During his time at King & Spalding, Wray acted as New Jersey Governor Chris Christie's personal attorney during the Bridgegate scandal. Wray's firm also represents Russian energy giants Gazprom and Rosneft, an issue which came under contention during the confirmation process for position of FBI Director.

 Director of the Federal Bureau of Investigation (2017–present) 

On June 7, 2017, President Donald Trump announced his intention to nominate Wray to be the next Director of the Federal Bureau of Investigation, replacing James Comey, who was dismissed by Trump on May 9, 2017. Trump interviewed Wray for the vacant FBI Director job on May 30, 2017, according to then Press Secretary Sean Spicer. Wray's Senate confirmation hearing commenced on July 12, 2017. Among other testimony, when asked if he believed that the investigation into Russian 2016 election interference and possible links to Trump's campaign is a "witch hunt", he stated that he did not.

On July 20, 2017, the Senate Judiciary Committee unanimously recommended to confirm Wray as the next Director of the FBI. Wray was officially confirmed by the Senate with bipartisan support on August 1, 2017; the vote was 92–5. He was sworn in by Attorney General Jeff Sessions in a private ceremony on August 2, 2017. Wray was formally sworn in on September 28, 2017, in a ceremony that was not attended by President Trump, marking the first time an FBI director has been sworn in without the President who nominated him present at the ceremony.

On February 13, 2018, in a Senate Select Committee on Intelligence hearing focused on Chinese espionage in the United States, Senator Marco Rubio [R-FL] asked Wray about the risk posed from Chinese students in advanced science and mathematics programs. In response, Wray stated "nontraditional collectors" (which he elaborated to include professors, scientists, and students) are "exploiting the very open research and development environment that we have" and consequently he viewed the risk "as not just a whole of government threat but a whole of society threat". Representatives Judy Chu [D-CA], Ted Lieu [D-CA], and Grace Meng [D-NY] released statements criticizing Wray's response as "irresponsible generalizations" implying that all Chinese students and scholars were spies. A coalition of Asian American advocacy groups wrote an open letter to Wray asking for a dialogue "to discuss how well-intentioned public policies might nonetheless lead to troubling issues of potential bias, racial profiling, and wrongful prosecution". In a follow-up interview with NBC, Wray stood by his earlier remarks, elaborating that "To be clear, we do not open investigations based on race, or ethnicity, or national origin. But when we open investigations into economic espionage, time and time again, they keep leading back to China."

On December 9, 2019, Wray was interviewed by ABC News following the release of the DoJ inspector general's report on the origins of the Russia investigation.  In the interview, when asked about characterizations of the FBI and its agents as the "deep state", Wray responded: "I think that's the kind of label that's a disservice to the men and women who work at the FBI who I think tackle their jobs with professionalism, with rigor, with objectivity, with courage. So that's not a term I would ever use to describe our work force and I think it's an affront to them."  He said he did not believe the Trump campaign was unfairly targeted by the FBI probe. He also denied that Ukraine interfered in the 2016 presidential elections, stating "We have no information that indicates that Ukraine interfered with the 2016 presidential election" and "as far as the [2020] election itself goes, we think Russia represents the most significant threat." This led Trump to criticize Wray the following day, claiming that Wray would "never be able to fix the FBI."

In January 2020, Senator Chris Murphy wrote to Wray, urging the FBI to "investigate the allegations" that Saudi Arabia "illegally compromised and stole personal data" from Jeff Bezos, the owner of The Washington Post, as part of a possible effort to "influence, if not silence, the Washington Post’s reporting on Saudi Arabia".

In April 2020, President Trump considered ousting Wray and replacing him with William Evanina but when Attorney General William Barr threatened to resign, Trump backed down.
In May 2020, Wray ordered an internal review into possible misconduct in the FBI's investigation of Trump's former national security adviser Michael Flynn.

On June 4, 2020, Wray stated that "anarchists" like antifa are "exploiting" George Floyd protests "to pursue violent, extremist agendas". Wray later clarified that antifa is an ideology rather than any specific organization, clashing with Trump.

In July 2020, Wray called People's Republic of China the "greatest long-term threat" to the United States. He said that "the FBI is now opening a new China-related counterintelligence case every 10 hours. Of the nearly 5,000 active counterintelligence cases currently under way across the country, almost half are related to China." Wray cited the Anthem medical data breach that exposed the personal information of more than 78 million people and the 2017 Equifax data breach that impacted more than 145 million Americans. Wray argued China was trying to become the world's only superpower, supplanting the United States.

On October 28, 2020, the FBI Agents Association released a letter addressed to both Trump and Joe Biden requesting Wray remain Director of the FBI for the 10-year term.

On December 2, 2020, a member of then-president-elect Biden's transition team announced that if Wray was not fired or removed from his position by President Trump, then he would remain as the Director of the FBI.

On March 2, 2021, Wray gave testimony in Senate hearings about the extremism that led to the 2021 storming of the United States Capitol in which he condemned the attack on the U.S. Capitol and argued that it was a case of domestic terrorism.

In February 2023, Wray appeared in an interview on Fox News endorsing the theory that the COVID-19 virus may have leaked from a laboratory in China. The endorsement comes after the United States Department of Energy and the Federal Bureau of Investigation both released statements saying that it was likely that the virus had come after a lab leak in China. The assessments were made with "low confidence" and "moderate confidence", respectively.

 Personal life 
Wray married Helen Garrison Howell, a Yale classmate, in 1989. They have a son, Trip, and a daughter, Caroline, and live in Georgia.

From January 2016 to July 2017, the month of his confirmation, Wray earned $9.2 million working as an attorney for the law firm King & Spalding, significantly more than his salary as FBI Director. According to a calculation from The Wall Street Journal'', Wray's net worth in 2017 was estimated to be $23 million to $42 million.

Wray is a Republican and a member of the Federalist Society.

See also
Foreign electoral intervention

References

External links 

 FBI Director biography
 Department of Justice biography
 

|-

1966 births
20th-century American lawyers
21st-century American lawyers
Assistant United States Attorneys
Biden administration personnel
Buckley School (New York City) alumni
Directors of the Federal Bureau of Investigation
Federalist Society members
George W. Bush administration personnel
Georgia (U.S. state) lawyers
Georgia (U.S. state) Republicans
Law clerks of J. Michael Luttig
Lawyers from New York City
Living people
Phillips Academy alumni
Trump administration personnel
United States Assistant Attorneys General for the Criminal Division
United States Department of Justice lawyers
Yale College alumni
Yale Law School alumni